Nuno Roque is a Portuguese artist, actor, singer-songwriter and director.

Biography

Child Star

His mother was a revue performer. He made his stage debut aged three at Coliseu do Porto and began a successful career as a child singer in Portugal. Roque's repertoire was known for employing a variety of musical styles, such as dance, rock, cha-cha-cha and most notably, pop. His main collaborator was record producer Tony Lemos. 

Throughout his early years, Roque won several awards at festivals and singing competitions and gained national recognition for his energetic television performances and androgynous image. In 1995, he released his first album, Brincar a Brincar, which compiled his most famous songs.

Theatre and Opera

He made his theatrical debut in São João National Theatre's production of The Resistible Rise of Arturo Ui by Bertolt Brecht. In 2005, he appeared in the first Portuguese production of The Laramie Project, directed by Diogo Infante, playing Matthew Shepard's murderer Aaron McKinney. 

In his adolescence, he studied theatre and film in Portugal (graduating from Academia Contêmporanea do Espectáculo – Escola de Artes), Brazil (where he was a student of Fábio Barreto and Augusto Boal at Casa de Artes das Laranjeiras in Rio de Janeiro) and France, where he graduated from the École Internationale de Théâtre Jacques Lecoq in Paris, studying physical theatre and other major dramatic territories, such as melodrama, mime, tragedy, commedia dell'arte, clowning and buffon.

In France, his notable theatre appearances include C'était Marie-Antoinette at Festival de Radio France in 2009, Théâtre du Châtelet's production of The Magic Flute and Opéra National de Montpellier's production of Dido and Aeneas, playing The Sorceress. In 2011, he joined the troupe of Irina Brook, daughter of Peter Brook, on her production of Peter Pan at Théâtre de Paris. His performance as John Darling was praised for its employment of comedy, dance, singing, mime and acrobatics by Le Figaro, France Inter and Financial Times.

Contemporary Art
In 2015, his work My Cake, was unveiled simultaneously in six European museums as part of Mons, European Capital of Culture. The art film was nominated for various art and music awards. In 2022, he was nominated for the Prix Voltaire de la Photographie for his series of self-portraits Self-Reflections (co-created with Gaudi Kaiser). On this occasion, the Centre des Monuments Nationaux exhibited Roque's work at the Château de Ferney-Voltaire and the Château de Bussy-Rabutin.

Cinema and Television
In April 2017, he hosted Le Gros Journal talk show on Canal+, live from The Peninsula Paris palace with a segment titled Le Coup d'un Soir avec Nuno Roque (One Night Stand with Nuno Roque). In 2018, he made his feature-film debut playing an illiterate 20-year-old in Best Intentions, starring opposite Agnès Jaoui, and participated as a guest columnist in the program Bons Baisers d'Europe on France 2.

In 2017, Nuno Roque joined #RightsOutLoud, a global campaign by the United Nations to help promote the Universal Declaration of Human Rights through multilingual videos, alongside figures such as António Guterres and Paulo Coelho. Roque recorded videos, in English, Portuguese and French, for an educational platform that aims to broaden access to the Declaration to millions of illiterate and visually impaired.

Stage

Filmography

Film

Television

Discography
 Brincar a Brincar (1995) (Portugal)
 Eu, o Cão e o Gato (1997) (Portugal)

Tours
 1997 : Turné Nuno Roque (Portugal)
 1996 : Turné Brincar a Brincar (Portugal)
 1995 : Nuno Roque – O Espectáculo (Portugal)
 1994 : Nuno Roque – A Alegria Dos Pequenitos, o Encanto Dos Adultos (Portugal)

Awards and nominations

References

External links
Official Website
 

Living people
20th-century Portuguese male singers
Portuguese singer-songwriters
Portuguese pop singers
Portuguese child singers
21st-century Portuguese male actors
Portuguese male singer-songwriters
Portuguese male film actors
Portuguese male stage actors
Portuguese male television actors
Place of birth missing (living people)
21st-century Portuguese male singers
Year of birth missing (living people)
Portuguese artists